Reskin may refer to:

Barbara Reskin (born 1945), American professor of sociology
Reskin or rebadge, to apply a different badge or trademark to an existing product (e.g. an automobile) 
Reskin, in computer game development, to apply a new skin (computing) 
Specifically within videogames, a reskin is a remodeling of a pre-existing item or model in a game, usually without any meaningful performative changes.

See also
Skin (disambiguation)